Brian Jones (born 17 March 1959) is a New Zealand sailor. He competed at the 1992 Summer Olympics and the 1996 Summer Olympics.

References

External links
 

1959 births
Living people
New Zealand male sailors (sport)
Olympic sailors of New Zealand
Sailors at the 1992 Summer Olympics – Tornado
Sailors at the 1996 Summer Olympics – Tornado
Sportspeople from Lower Hutt